Mambo Italiano may refer to:
 
 "Mambo Italiano" (song), a popular song written by Bob Merrill in 1954
 Mambo Italiano (film), directed by Émile Gaudreault